Andrew Booth (born 16 July 1997) is a Jamaican footballer who plays as a midfielder for Charleston Battery in the USL Championship.

Career

Youth, College & Amateur
Booth played with the Plantation Academy from 2005 to 2014 and then spent a single season with Kendall Soccer Club.

In 2015, Booth attended Florida International University to play college soccer. He redshirted his 2015 freshman season, but went on to make 51 appearances for the Panthers, scoring 7 goals and tallying 9 assists. During his time at FIU, Booth won accolades such as All-Conference USA Second Team in his junior season and in his senior season recorded a team-high 15 points and won Conference USA Midfielder of the Year honors and a position on the All-CUSA First Team.

While at college, Booth also played in the NPSL and USL PDL. He appeared for Fort Lauderdale Strikers U23 in the NPSL in 2016, and PDL sides South Florida Surf and Treasure Coast Tritons in 2017 and 2018 respectively.

Professional career
On January 13, 2020, Booth was selected 96th overall in the 2020 MLS SuperDraft by Minnesota United. However, he was not signed by the club.

On September 11, 2020, Booth signed with USL League One side Greenville Triumph. He made his debut two days later, appearing as an 84th-minute substitute during a 2–0 win over Forward Madison.

On January 28, 2021, Booth's MLS rights were traded from Minnesota to CF Montréal, who in return received the rights to Jukka Raitala.

Booth signed with Charleston Battery of the USL Championship on January 3, 2022.

International
In February 2016, Booth was called-up to the Jamaica under-20 national team training camp. However, to date has not been capped by Jamaica at any level.

References

External links
 

1997 births
Living people
Association football midfielders
FIU Panthers men's soccer players
South Florida Surf players
Treasure Coast Tritons players
Greenville Triumph SC players
Charleston Battery players
Minnesota United FC draft picks
National Premier Soccer League players
People from Tamarac, Florida
Soccer players from Florida
USL League One players
USL League Two players
Sportspeople from Broward County, Florida
Jamaican footballers